This page lists Bulgarian finance ministers.

List (1990–)

Before 1990

Principality of Bulgaria since 28 April 1879

 Grigor Nachovich 
 Petko Karavelov
 Georgi Scheljaskovitsch
 Grigor Nachovich 
 Leonid Sobolev
 Todor Burmov
 Grigor Nachovich
 Michail Sarafov
 Petko Karavelov
 Todor Burmov
 Ivan Evstratiev Geshov
 Grigor Nachovich 
 Ivan Evstratiev Geshov
 Vasil Radoslavov
 Konstantin Stoilov
 Grigor Nachovich 
 Ivan Salabaschev
 Georgi Schivkov 
 Christo Beltschev
 Grigor Nachovich 
 Ivan Salabaschev
 Ivan Evstratiev Geshov
 Teodor Teodorov
 Michail Tenev
 Todor Ivanchov
 Christo Bontschev
 Petko Karavelov
 Michail Sarafov
 Anton Manouschev
 Lasar Pajakov
 Ivan Salabaschev (29 January 1908 – 18 September 1910)

Kingdom of Bulgaria since 22 September 1908 

 Ivan Salabashev (29 January 1908 – 18 September 1910)
 Andrey Lyapchev
 Dimitar Tonchev
 Stoyan Danev
 Rayko Daskalov
 Marko Tourlakov
 Petar Janev
 Petar Todorov
 Vladimir Mollov
 Alexander Guirguinov
 Stefan Stefanov
 Michail Kalendarov
 Marko Rjaskov
 Stoicho Moushanov
 Kiril Gunev
 Dobri Bozhilov
 Dimitar Savov
 Petko Stojanov
 Stancho Cholakov

People's Republic of Bulgaria since 15 September 1946 

 Ivan Stefanov (31 March 1946 - 6 August 1949)
 Petko Kunin (6 August 1949- 8 October 1949)
 Kiril Lasarov (8 October 1949 -  27 November 1962)
 Dimitar Petrov Popov (27 November 1962 - 17 June 1976)
 Beltscho Belchev (17 June 1976 - 20 December 1990)

References

Lists of political office-holders in Bulgaria